Robert Lee Fisher (born March 17, 1958) is a former American football tight end. He played in the National Football League (NFL) for the Chicago Bears from 1980-1981.

Following his retirement, Fisher spent time as a volunteer coach at Munster High School and worked as an advertising account executive.

References

1958 births
Living people
Players of American football from Pasadena, California
American football tight ends
SMU Mustangs football players
Chicago Bears players
Chicago Blitz players
Blair High School (Pasadena, California) alumni
Brian Piccolo Award winners